"Nobody's Fool" is a song by the British rock band Slade, released in 1976 as the third and final single from the band's sixth studio album Nobody's Fools. It was written by lead vocalist Noddy Holder and bassist Jim Lea, and produced by Chas Chandler. Released in April 1976, the single failed to chart in the UK Top 50, but reached No. 3 on the BMRB's UK Breakers Chart.

Background
By 1975, Slade began to feel stale, believing they had achieved as much success in the UK and Europe as they could. The band and their manager Chas Chandler decided that their next career move should be to try and crack America. The band agreed to move to there and build a reputation for their live performances from scratch, just as they had in the UK. In between touring, the band recorded their next album, Nobody's Fools, which was released in March 1976. Like the title track, the album saw Slade move towards a more "American" soul/pop sound in attempt to gain a commercial break on the American charts. Lea had originally intended for "Nobody's Fool" to be a "twenty-minute extravaganza". However, the band later agreed to cut the duration and record the song in a more standard format to appeal to the band's fanbase. The song featured Tasha Thomas on backing vocals. Chandler had produced the album himself, instead of finding a producer with a proven track record – maybe not his cleverest move on the band's behalf.

Released as a single in April 1976, the song failed to reach the UK Top 50, breaking Slade's run of seventeen consecutive hits. It reached No. 3 on the BMRB's UK Breakers Chart, which would be equal to No. 53 on the UK Singles Chart at a time when the national singles chart only ran to the Top 50. In America, "Nobody's Fool" was the only single to be released from the album, but like the album, it was not a commercial success there.

Release
"Nobody's Fool" was released on 7" vinyl by Polydor in the UK, Belgium, Germany, Yugoslavia, Canada and Brazil. In America, it was released by Warner Bros. Records. The B-side on the Polydor releases of the single was the Nobody's Fools album track "L.A. Jinx". In America, "When the Chips Are Down" featured as the B-side, which was previously the B-side to the 1976 single "Let's Call It Quits". In Brazil, "Nobody's Fool" was released as a four-track extended play, including "Let's Call It Quits", "In for a Penny" and "Can You Just Imagine".

Music video
A music video was filmed at St. Johns Wood Studios in London by the production company Trilion Video. It was directed by Bruce Gowers, who directed Queen's "Bohemian Rhapsody" video the year before. Despite being Slade's most complex video at that time, it would only be shown once in the UK on Sally James's London Weekend Television show Saturday Scene.

Critical reception
Upon release as a single, Record Mirror felt it was the "best single Slade have released for ages", adding that it was "very catchy", "bright and bouncy", and "Slade at their best". In a retrospective review of Nobody's Fools, Geoff Ginsberg of AllMusic stated the song was "excellent, but marred by a bad arrangement".

Formats
7" single
"Nobody's Fool" – 3:50
"L.A. Jinx" – 3:57

7" single (American release)
"Nobody's Fool (Edit)" – 3:15
"When the Chips are Down" – 4:16

7" single (American promo release)
"Nobody's Fool (Edit) (Mono)" – 3:15
"Nobody's Fool (Edit) (Stereo)" – 3:15

7" single (Brazilian EP release)
"Nobody's Fool" – 3:50
"Let's Call It Quits" – 3:30
"In for a Penny" – 3:35
"Can You Just Imagine" – 3:32

Cover versions
In 1977, Light Fantastic would record a version of the song for their album Sensational.
In 1979, Jim Lea would record his own version of the song with his brother Frank as part of his side-project The Dummies. This version of the song would not surface until 1992, when it was included on A Day in the Life of the Dummies, an album that gathered The Dummies' recordings.

Chart performance

Personnel
Slade
Noddy Holder – lead vocals, guitar
Dave Hill – lead guitar, backing vocals
Jim Lea – bass, piano, backing vocals
Don Powell – drums

Additional personnel
Chas Chandler – producer
Tasha Thomas – backing vocals

References

1976 singles
Slade songs
Songs written by Noddy Holder
Songs written by Jim Lea
Song recordings produced by Chas Chandler